Gabbar Singh is a 2012 Indian Telugu-language action comedy film directed by Harish Shankar. The film is a remake of the 2010 Hindi film Dabangg and stars Pawan Kalyan and Shruti Haasan. The plot follows a police officer who embarks on a mission to take down a corrupt politician. Devi Sri Prasad composed the film's music and Jayanan Vincent was the cinematographer.

Made on a budget of 30 crore, the film was formally launched on 18 August 2011 at Hyderabad with shooting primarily held at Pollachi. It was released on 11 May 2012 and was declared a blockbuster, grossing around 150 crore worldwide, becoming one of the highest-grossing South Indian films of all time. Kalyan won the Filmfare Award for Best Actor – Telugu award at the 59th Filmfare Awards South. A sequel, Sardaar Gabbar Singh, was released in 2016.

Plot 
  
Venkataratnam Naidu lives with his mother, stepfather Naidu, and a younger step-brother Ajay in Kondaveedu. His stepfather is always partial towards his step-brother much to the anger of Venkataratnam. He stops bothering about what other people think about him and renames himself after the fictional character "Gabbar Singh". As his anger towards his brother and father grows, Gabbar Singh runs away from home. His stepfather, Naidu gets hold of him and admits him in a boarding school away from Kondaveedu.

21 years later, Gabbar Singh is a police officer posted as the Circle Inspector (CI) for the Kondaveedu region. His anger towards his brother and stepfather remains the same and lives separately from them. Though he wants to live with his mother in his new house, she wants him to stay with her and Naidu. Ajay is a gambling addict and has debts all over the village. Gabbar Singh falls in love with a handicraft vendor named Bhagya Lakshmi, whom he chances upon during a police raid that he conducts against gambling.

Siddhappa Naidu is a goon in Kondaveedu who With the help of his uncle, aspires to become the MLA of that region in the upcoming by-election. He wants to be nominated by the ruling party. Though Siddhappa despises Gabbar Singh for obstructing his illegal affairs, he tries to appreciate him. Gabbar Singh refuses and tells Siddhappa that he actually knows who he is and tells him to behave himself. Angered by Gabbar Singh's response, Siddhappa sends goons to disrupt the market yard in Kondaveedu. Gabbar Singh confronts the goons and defeats them with ease to reopen the market yard. Enraged Siddhappa now plans to kill Gabbar Singh but his uncle instead advises him to speak with the Home Minister about transferring Gabbar Singh out of Kondaveedu. Siddhappa and his uncle meet the minister, who simply denies their request. He also advises Siddhappa to make peace with Gabbar Singh or it would hurt his political aspirations.

Meanwhile, Gabbar Singh meets Bhagya Lakshmi and proposes marriage. She rejects by saying that she has to look after her ailing father, who is an alcoholic and she cannot marry while he is alive. Gabbar Singh then comes home to find his mother dead. He goes to his stepfather to make peace, as he is the only family left. His stepfather rejects and despises him as an outcast. Gabbar Singh is then attacked at the handicraft exhibition by Siddhappa's men when he is with Bhagya Lakshmi; he kills all of them in a fight. He confronts Siddhappa and warns him to stop bothering him and tells him that he will never allow Siddhappa to become an MLA.

Provoked by Siddhappa's men, Gabbar Singh's brother hits one of his creditors brutally and injuring him. Siddhappa calls the police station to warn them about the fight. Gabbar Singh beats up his brother in public, thus disgracing him. Siddhappa decides to take advantage of the situation and suspend Gabbar Singh. However, Naidu resolves the situation by accepting an apology from Gabbar Singh. Angered by the outcome, Siddhappa tells Gabbar Singh that something big will happen in the next 24 hours and challenges him to stop it. Gabbar Singh interrogates the henchmen of Siddhappa and finds out that Siddhappa arranged the marriage of Bhagya Lakshmi with a local merchant by paying her father a lot of money to enrage Gabbar Singh. Gabbar Singh goes to the wedding and confronts Bhagya Lakshmi about whether she loves him or not. Bhagya Lakshmi reveals her love and Gabbar Singh rescues and marries her in the same event.

Siddhappa, as a last effort tries to bribe the high command to get a party nomination to contest in the election. He offers 50 million to get the ticket. Gabbar Singh learns of the arrangement and steals the money that Siddhappa sends to the high command. Gabbar Singh's brother in desperate need of money is approached by Siddhappa. He offers help and money and in exchange asks him to work for his elections. Siddhappa orders him to deliver a cellphone (an iPhone 4 box) and a box of sweets to the Minister's house. But, unknown to him, a bomb has been placed in the sweet box, and kills the minister. Knowing that it was Gabbar Singh's brother who did the blast, the district superintendent suspends Gabbar Singh. Gabbar Singh confronts his stepfather Naidu tells him about his brother. Naidu suffers a heart attack after hearing the news and is hospitalized. Gabbar Singh takes care of Naidu at the hospital, thus bonding again. Gabbar's brother who is shocked by the events and the blast convinces Siddhappa to kill Gabbar before the latter catches him. Although he has no intention to kill his brother, he accepts to do it to escape from them and meets Gabbar Singh. He confesses to Gabbar that he was sent to kill him by Siddhappa. Gabbar tries to take him to the commissioner for a confession against Siddhappa. But Siddhappa calls Gabbar on his phone and reveals to him that he killed Gabbar's mother when he came to Gabbar's old home in search of his money. In a final battle, Gabbar arrives to Siddhappa's house and takes down the goons, and kills Siddhappa. Gabbar Singh later hires most of the Siddhappa's henchmen and gives them low-profile police jobs.

Cast 

 Pawan Kalyan as Venkataratnam Naidu / Gabbar Singh 
Akash Puri as Young Venkataratnam Naidu / Young Gabbar Singh 
 Shruti Haasan as Bhagyalakshmi
 Abhimanyu Singh as Siddhappa Naidu
 Ajay as Gabbar Singh's brother
 Suhasini Maniratnam as Gabbar Singh's mother
 Nagineedu as Naidu, Gabbar Singh's stepfather
 Kota Srinivasa Rao as Bhagyalakshmi's father
 Rao Ramesh as Minister Pradeep Kumar
 Brahmanandam as Recovery Ranjit Kumar 
 Ali as Constable Ram Prasad aka 'Samba' (see his real name on his entry scene) 
 Jaya Prakash Reddy as Police Commissioner
 Tanikella Bharani as Siddhappa Naidu's uncle
 Prabhakar as Banda Swamy
 Prabhas Sreenu as Siddappa Seenu
 Hari Teja as Bhagyalakshmi's assistant
 Prudhvi Raj as Nagaraju
 Praveen as Yakambaram, Ranjit Kumar's PA
 Saptagiri
 Dhanraj
 Satya
 Satyam Rajesh
 Chammak Chandra
 Fish Venkat as Siddhappa Naidu's henchman
 Malaika Arora in the item number "Kevvu Keka"
 Ravi Gowda in a cameo appearance

Production

Development
In 2011, Pawan expressed interest in remaking the Hindi film Dabangg to Telugu as he was impressed with the film. Arbaaz Khan sold the remake rights to Pawan. It was originally announced that Pawan would produce the film under his newly formed production banner "Pawan Kalyan Creative Works"; however, it was announced as Bandla Ganesh will produce the film under his banner Parameswara Cine Creations. Pawan approached Harish to direct the Telugu remake of Dabangg. Harish Shankar revealed he was supposed to direct Mirapakaay (originally titled "Romantic Rishi") with Pawan Kalyan which was dropped due to various reasons. Pawan Kalyan reportedly told the director to take the basic theme of the film and change all the scenes to suit the Telugu nativity. Harish wrote a fresh screenplay of "Dabangg" with new situations different from the original. Pawan who read the script was satisfied with the screenplay and called it "so fresh ... apt for Telugu sensibilities". Harish said that it was Pawan who suggested to name the film as Gabbar Singh with the tagline "He is Special".

Casting

Sonu Sood was approached to reprise his character from the Hindi and Tamil versions, which he rejected, stating that he did not want to repeat it again. Abhimanyu Singh was recruited to play the character. Harish revealed that he "loved Abhimanyu Singh’s eyes in Rakta Charitra film. I thought he would match the hero in the role of Siddappa Naidu". Tanikella Bharani was selected to play Om Puri's character. Harish said that he increased the length of the Om Puri character played by Tanikella Bharani in Telugu so that he would support the villain with the dialogue part. Srikanth and Sushanth were originally considered to reprise Arbaaz Khan's character but eventually was replaced by Ajay. It was rumoured that either Krishnam Raju or Nandamuri Harikrishna would don the father's character but Nagineedu was selected to play the character. Harish Shankar signed Shruti Haasan as the film's actress. Shruti had signed the film in November 2011 replacing Ileana D'Cruz who had opted out, and played the role of Bhagyalakshmi, a village girl, which had been played by Sonakshi Sinha in the original version. Nathalia Kaur, Parvati Melton and Anushka Shetty were originally considered to perform the item number. Malaika Arora Khan was finally selected to perform item number for which she was reported to be paid ; however, Ganesh denied that Malaika was paid 1 cr and also refused to divulge details about her remuneration. Kota Srinivasa Rao, Rao Ramesh and Jaya Prakash Reddy were selected to portray supporting roles.

Character looks
Pawan Kalyan wears a cargo shirt (with the buttons taken off) fitted with police logos. He ties a red towel around his head before fighting. He also wears dark shades and hooded shirts. Shruthi Haasan wears half sarees in the first half of the movie while she sticks to sarees in the second half. She uses bluish shades for the costumes. She uses crape and chiffon sarees in songs and in the second half with pattern blouses.  Abhimanyu wears linen fabric pattern Kurtis with bordered patti on collar and cuffs which brings in the look of a local politician. He appears in both dark and lighter shades. His accessories, a lot of gold ornaments, rudrakshas, etc., show the nativity of a village's political villain.

Filming
The filming began in September 2011. All the scenes especially related to the police station were shot in Pollachi. The shooting was started without Pawan Kalyan as he needed to grow his beard again after shaving it off for a song shoot of Panjaa. Pawan Kalyan entered the sets of Gabbar Singh on the afternoon of 4 December 2011. The first dialogue of him was okayed in the first take. The song "Akasam ammai aithe" was completely planned at the green fields of Pollachi but the team had to do a part of the song in Hyderabad due to bad weather in Pollachi. The climax sequence was shot on the Hyd – Vijayawada national highway. The song "Dekho Dekho Gabbar Singh" was shot for four days at Gujarat and one day at ICRISAT. The interval fight scene was shot at Gayathri Hills in January 2012. The team then shot scenes at the house set at Kokapet which was built for the film Maryada Ramanna (2010) in March 2012.

Themes and influences
The film was a remake of Dabangg (2010). Several new scenes were included in the Telugu version like the "Antakshari" and "Kabaddi" sequences. Harish said: "After watching Dabangg, I analysed why it became a hit. It is a multi-layered film with a rustic backdrop. It has Vishal Bharadwaj and Anurag Kashyap type of treatment to it. It’s a completely different genre film for Salman Khan. The hero has grey shades to him. [..] The script has a typical 70s type of Manmohan Desai's commercial formula".

Few dialogues were written for and uttered by Pawan Kalyan's character in the film. Dialogues like "Naku konchem thikka undi, kani daniko lekka undi" (I am crazy, but my craziness has a calculation) epitomises the nature of the characterisation of cop roles in Telugu cinema. Director Harish Shankar defended by quoting, "Fans like to see their favourite stars doing incredible things. I just tried to tweak Pawan's character for a better audience connection. The last dialogue of Pawan in the film "Police ane vaadu...Janam lo bhayam pogottevaadu avvali, kaani jananni bhayapette vaadu kaadu" (Police are there to prevent fear among people, but people should not be feared of us) sums up our film. I respect police officers and have made sure that we do not offend them in any way". The lyrics of the song Kevvu Keka draw heavily from folk literature (Jana Padams), this art form was developed by uneducated farmers who wrote those songs to entertain themselves while working in the fields.

Music

The soundtrack of the film was composed by Devi Sri Prasad. On 15 April 2012, Pawan Kalyan along with Bandla Ganesh, Harish Shankar and few others visited Tirumala, where they released the first song from the film and soon after that they went to Visakhapatnam and visited Simhachalam Temple where they released the second song from the film. The audio was released through Aditya Music label and an audio launch event took place at Shilpakala Vedika in Hyderabad on the very same day.

Popular Telugu actor Kota Srinivasa Rao lent his vocals for a song in the film. Lyrics for the two songs were penned by Sahithi and remaining songs were written by Ramajogayya Sastry, Chandrabose, Devi Sri Prasad and Bhaskarabhatla. Devi Sri Prasad had written the lyrics for the song "Pilla". There were rumours that the song called "O Bava" were circulating around the internet but Devi denied that he had composed such a song for the film and "someone have might have uploaded it 'by mistake' as our song."

Release 
Gabbar Singh was initially planned to be released on Sankranthi. The film was supposed to release on 27 April but was eventually released worldwide on 11 May 2012. The film was released worldwide in around 2500 theaters. Central Board of Film Certification passed the film with an 'U/A' certificate. British Board of Film Classification passed the film with a '15' rating due to strong violence.

Bluesky Cinemas acquired the entire overseas theatrical distribution rights. TGM acquired the distribution rights for Gulf. Leo Entertainment, purchased the complete UK and Europe theatrical rights of the film. Elixir Entertainment bought theatrical rights for New Zealand and Australia.

Legal issues
AP Police Officers Association were upset with the way the police has been portrayed in the film. KV Chalapathi Rao, State President of AP Police Officers Association said, "The red towel which Pawan Kalyan wears in one of the movie stills is the point of contention. We see municipality workers in such attire generally and it is derogatory to show a police officer in such light".

Home media 
The VCDs, DVDs and Blu-ray discs of the film were released by Sri Balaji Videos on 22 August 2012 on the occasion of Chiranjeevi's birthday. The film was broadcast on 14 January 2013 on the occasion of Sankranthi festival and registered a TRP of 24 points during its premiere surpassing Magadheera (2009).

Reception

Critical reception 
123Telugu.com termed the film as "A Solid Entertainer". Idlebrain.com commented, "Pawan Strikes". Sify wrote:"The first half is filled with mass masala, while the second half turns hackneyed, but the drawback is instantly overcome thanks to the comedy". Rediff wrote:"Entertaining it may be, but Gabbar Singh is filled with violence and some vulgarity and not meant for the very young audience". Sangeetha Devi Dundoo of Hindu said: "The story is formulaic. Don't expect anything out of the box. What comes as a saver is an engaging screenplay, witty dialogues and performances from the actors". Karthik Pasupulate of Times of India rated the film 4 out of 5 stars stating that: "The movie sets a new benchmark as far as "paisa vasool" goes." Indiaglitz wrote:"All in all, GS is a treat to Pawan's fans, but it has not been made for the first week audience alone.  This one will be a genuine hit, registering repeat audience for sure".

Box office 
Gabbar Singh created a new opening day box office record and subsequently created the records for the highest grossing weekend and highest grossing first week in the Tollywood of the time. It also stands amongst highest openers ever in the Indian film industry. On its first day the film grossed approximately 18 crore generating a net share of approximately 13 crore. The film had collected a record share of 27.4 crore worldwide with a record first week share of 25 crore from Andhra Pradesh alone. At the end of two weeks the film has collected a record share of 39 crore worldwide. The total three weeks share of the film now stands at 50.45 crore. The film has grossed more than 1 million at the United States box office. The film had earned  gross worldwide in the first three weeks. The film has completed 50 days in 307 centres on 29 June 2012. Sources added that Gabbar Singh has also registered another record of running in 250 direct centers. The film has shattered the box office collections records and has created a new history by raking around 53 crore share after 50 days run.

Awards and nominations

Legacy
The success of the film made Shruti Haasan one of the most sought-after actresses in Telugu cinema. The film catapulted Pawan again into beckoning after his continuous failures Puli (2010), Theenmaar (2011) and Panjaa (2011). Nisha Kothari starrer Bullet Rani is said to be inspired by Gabbar Singh. Suresh Goswami, director of the film clarified that "I don't mind if my film is called the female version of Gabbar Singh, but it's definitely not a spoof. In fact, Nisha's role is inspired by Pawan's tough cop act in his film". Teaser of Aagadu (2014) was also said to be inspired by that film.

In popular culture
The films Kevvu Keka (2012), Gunde Jaari Gallanthayyinde (2013) and Pilla Nuvvu Leni Jeevitham (2014) were named after the songs from the film. The song "Kevvu Keka" was parodied in Atharintiki Daaredi (2013). In Naayak (2013), Nayak (Ram Charan) and Nandini (Amala Paul) are seen watching the Bengali dub of Gabbar Singh in a theatre. The "Antakshari" sequence was parodied in Shadow (2013), featuring "Kevvu Keka". In Race Gurram (2014), Lucky (Allu Arjun) and Spandana (Shruti Haasan) are watching Gabbar Singh at a cafe.

Sequel 
Pawan Kalyan announced his intention to star in Gabbar Singh 2, which he would begin working on after his film Atharintiki Daaredi released in October 2013. However, the film was postponed due to the political entry of Pawan Kalyan and was set to go on floors in December 2014. The film will not be a prequel or sequel to the original Gabbar Singh, but a stand-alone film within the Gabbar Singh franchise and the film was scripted by Kalyan himself. Sampath Nandi has been named as the film's director, with Devi Sri Prasad set to compose the film's music. Later, K. S. Ravindra (Bobby) of Power fame was announced as the director. Anisha Ambrose was announced as the lead female role; however, she was replaced by Kajal Agarwal. The regular shooting for Gabbar Singh 2 commenced on 29 May 2015 at Malshej Ghats in Maharashtra. The film (later titled Sardaar Gabbar Singh) was released in April 2016. The sequel however received negative reviews from critics and bombed at the box office.

Notes

References

External links 
 
 

Telugu remakes of Hindi films
2012 films
2010s Telugu-language films
2012 action comedy films
Indian police films
Indian action comedy films
2012 masala films
Films shot in Tamil Nadu
Films shot in Telangana
Fictional portrayals of the Andhra Pradesh Police
Films directed by Harish Shankar
Films scored by Devi Sri Prasad
Films shot at Ramoji Film City
Films shot in Switzerland
2012 comedy films
Films set in Andhra Pradesh
Films set in Vijayawada
Films shot in Vijayawada
Films shot in Andhra Pradesh